The FIL World Luge Championships 1958 took place in Krynica, Poland.

Men's singles

Women's singles

Men's doubles

Strillinger and Nachmann became the first repeat champions at the World Championships.

Medal table

References
Men's doubles World Champions
Men's singles World Champions
Women's singles World Champions

FIL World Luge Championships
1958 in luge
1958 in Polish sport
Luge in Poland